The pneumatics ("spiritual", from Greek , "spirit") were, in Gnosticism, the highest order of humans, the other two orders being psychics and hylics ("matter"). A pneumatic saw itself as escaping the doom of the material world via the transcendent knowledge of Sophia's Divine Spark within the soul.

In the New Testament a contrast is made between the psychikoi and the pneumatikoi, in the former of whom the mere animal soul predominates, the latter exhibiting the working of a higher spiritual nature (compare also ). In the Valentinian system this contrast is sharpened, and is made to depend on an original difference of nature between the two classes of men, a mythical theory being devised which professed to account for the origin of the different elements in men's nature; the psychic element being something higher and better than the mere material element, but immeasurably inferior to the pneumatic. It may well be believed that in the language of the Gnostic sects, the "pneumatici" are "spiritual men who have attained to the perfect knowledge of God, and been initiated into these mysteries by Achamoth" herself (Adv. Haer. I. 6, 1), ordinary Christians being branded as "psychici."

Such was also the use made of the latter word by Tertullian, who in his latest works, written after his Montanism had involved him in complete separation from the church, habitually uses the word Psychici to designate those from whom he had separated.

Descriptive term in religious studies
In the academic study of religion and mysticism more generally, pneumatic has been used as a classification term to define similar trends in wider contexts. For example, Joseph G. Weiss describes "A Circle of Pneumatics in Pre-Hasidism", in the context of Jewish mysticism. Here the pneumatic group have minor prophetic powers ("Ruah Ha-qodesh" in Jewish parlance), such as revealing the sins of their fellows. However they decide to renounce use of this, probably in response to communal suspicion in the wake of the Sabbatean Kabbalistic heresy. The Baal Shem Tov, founder of Hasidism, seeks recognition in the group, but is initially hindered by his lower status as a Baal Shem exorcist.

See also
Id, ego and super-ego

References

Attribution

External links
The Gnosis archive

Gnosticism

de:Pneumatiker